The Sky Raider is a 1925 American silent drama film directed by T. Hayes Hunter and starring Charles Nungesser, Jacqueline Logan and Gladys Walton. With the interest in the aviators of World War I, producer Gilbert E. Gable and Arcadia Productions, were able to showcase the talents of Nungesser, a genuine hero, who had 43 aerial victories, as the third-highest French ace. The Sky Raider was based on the short story, "The Great Air Mail Robbery" by Jack Lait.

Plot
A mechanic with the French Air Force, Gregg Vanesse (Lawford Davidson) sabotages the aircraft of Capt. Charles Nungesser (Charles Nungesser), France's "Flying Fiend", by stuffing the flying insignia from Paul Willard (Walter Miller) in the intake manifold. Paul is arrested, put on trial and sentenced to 20 years in a military prison.

Six years later, the Willards, a wealthy American family, arrive in France, searching for Paul, who had run away to war. Vanesse tells them that Paul died like a hero in the war. The Willards then meet Nungesser, who falls in love with Lucille (Jacqueline Logan), Paul's sister, and resolves to arrange for Paul's pardon.

Nungesser has Paul freed, and then goes to the United States to find Vanesse and discover the truth behind Paul's crime. When Nungesser discovers that Vanesse is planning to rob the air mail flight, with Paul's help, he captures Vanesse in a daring mid-air arrest and recovers the money.

Vanesse dies in an aircraft crash while Paul is cleared of all charges and marries his former sweetheart, Marie (Gladys Walton). Nungesser and Lucille also find true happiness.

Cast

 Charles Nungesser as Captain Charles Nungesser 
 Jacqueline Logan as Lucille Ward 
 Gladys Walton as Marie 
 Walter Miller as Paul Willard 
 Lawford Davidson as Gregg Vanesse 
 Theodore Babcock as Sen. Willard 
 Ida Darling as Mrs. Willard 
 Wilton Lackaye as Prison Commandant 
 Edouard Durand as Forot

Production
In 1924, Charles Nungesser had come to the United States as part of a barnstorming "flying circus". Arcadia Productions was quick to capitalize on his fame and signed him to star in The Sky Raider, which had scenes of air fighting in Europe as well as Nungesser thwarting an air mail robbery. Principal photography took place from December 1924 until mid-January 1925 at Glendale Studios, Long Island, New York.

Nungesser flew the Hanriot HD.1 he had brought over, and with his partner Louie Meier, also flew Thomas Morse S4Cs painted as German fighter aircraft. After the film's initial run, Nungesser sold the HD.1 to Jim Granger at Clover Field, California, who used it in local air shows.

Reception
The Sky Raider was popular with audiences and featured the flamboyant Nungesser not only making personal appearances but he would stunt fly over the theaters where the film was shown. The film was shown extensively from 1927-1929, and after Nungesser on 8 May 1927 disappeared while attempting a transatlantic flight, was often being advertised as starring the "late flying ace."

Preservation
With no prints of The Sky Raider located in any film archives, it is a lost film.

References

Notes

Citations

Bibliography

 Farmer, James H. Celluloid Wings: The Impact of Movies on Aviation. Blue Ridge Summit, Pennsylvania: Tab Books Inc., 1984. .
 Munden, Kenneth White. The American Film Institute Catalog of Motion Pictures Produced in the United States, Part 1. Berkeley, California: University of California Press, 1997. .
 Paris, Michael. From the Wright Brothers to Top Gun: Aviation, Nationalism, and Popular Cinema. Manchester, UK: Manchester University Press, 1995. .
 Pendo, Stephen. Aviation in the Cinema. Lanham, Maryland: Scarecrow Press, 1985. .
 Wynne, H. Hugh. The Motion Picture Stunt Pilots and Hollywood's Classic Aviation Movies. Missoula, Montana: Pictorial Histories Publishing Co., 1987. .

External links

 
 
 

1925 films
1925 drama films
American aviation films
Silent American drama films
Films directed by T. Hayes Hunter
American silent feature films
1920s English-language films
American black-and-white films
Films based on short fiction
Films shot in New York City
Associated Exhibitors films
1920s American films